St Cuthbert's Society Boat Club (SCSBC) is the rowing club of St Cuthbert's Society at Durham University. Founded in the summer of 1893 with the aim of representing St Cuthbert's Society at collegiate level, it is one of the oldest and most distinguished of Durham's collegiate clubs.

History
Founded in the summer of 1893 with the aim of representing St Cuthbert's Society at collegiate level, SCSBC is one of the oldest and most distinguished of Durham's collegiate clubs. The year after its founding the Club won its first trophy, the Challenge Pairs at Durham Regatta and has remained competitive amongst the college clubs throughout its history.

In its early years the club was most successful in sculling, with H.S.S. Jackson, E.C. Summers, H. de l’Isle Booth and T.M. Falconer enjoying success. Between the world wars the Club went into a decline but after World War II returned. The sculling success was continued by Tom Bishop and Pete Brett. 
 
The Club made their first visit to the Tideway in 1966 for Head of the River Race. A notable success came in the mid to late 1980s, with the crew of Henry Blackshaw, Daniel Tomlinson, Chris Lawrence and Tim Pitt coxed by Patrick Hurley going from Novices to Elite status in one year, and the women's crew of Elaine Hamilton, Vicky Foulsham, Elspeth Lindsley and Dawn Cox, coxed by Patrick Herlihy almost repeating the feat and going to Women's Henley.

The club's highest finishes on the Tideway are 137th at HORR (1993) and 102nd in WeHORR (1994).

Recent form
The Club attends the majority of local races in Newcastle, Stockton, York, Chester-le-Street, Hexham and Wansbeck, as well as other races in Durham such as the Novice Cup, the Senate Cup, Durham Small Boats' Head, Durham City Regatta and Admiral's Regatta.

In the summer of 2008, both the Men's and Women's VIIIs tasted success at a number of regattas throughout the North, including the Durham Regatta, helping to win the title of Victor Ludorum for both Durham Regatta and Admirals Regatta, a college event organised by Durham College Rowing.

The Men's squad qualified for Henley Royal Regatta in 2003 and in 2006, and has taken part regularly in the annual Head of the River Race in London.

Boathouse and facilities
The clubs boathouse is located by The Racecourse close to the Durham Regatta finish line and was acquired by the Society shortly after its establishment. Built in 1894, it was previously home to Durham Amateur Rowing Club which is now located in newer premises further upstream. It has an ergo loft, drawing room and riverside balcony.

Members of the club can also attend social functions, including a formal Boat Club Dinner at the end of Michaelmas term, a men's squad warriors social in February, and a boat club day in the summer, which is celebrated with a riverside barbecue, squad photographs and recreational rowing.

Governance
The club is run by a student executive committee who are elected annually by the entire membership at an AGM.

References

Durham University Rowing Clubs
1893 establishments in England
Sports clubs established in 1893
Grade II listed buildings in County Durham